Ramu Kawai, also known as Ram, is a Japanese olympic breakdancer. She participated at the 2018 Summer Youth Olympics in the dancesport competition, being awarded the gold medal in the B-Girls' event. Kawai also participated in the breaking mixed event, being awarded the gold medal with her teammate, Lê Minh Hiếu. She attended Kanagawa Prefectural Yurigaoka High School.

References

External links 

Living people
Place of birth missing (living people)
Year of birth missing (living people)
Breakdancers
Breakdancers at the 2018 Summer Youth Olympics
Medalists at the 2018 Summer Youth Olympics
Youth Olympic gold medalists for Japan